Maciej Płażyński (10 February 1958 – 10 April 2010) was a Polish liberal-conservative politician.

Biography
Płażyński was born in Młynary. He began his political career in 1980 / 1981 as one of the leaders of the Students' Solidarity; he was governor of the Gdańsk Voivodship from August 1990 to July 1996, and was elected to the Sejm (the lower house of the Polish parliament) in September 1997. To date he is longest serving Marshal of the Sejm of the Third Republic of Poland.

In January 2001, he founded the Civic Platform political party with Donald Tusk and Andrzej Olechowski. He left Civic Platform for personal reasons and at the time of his death was an independent MP. He was member of Kashubian-Pomeranian Association. He was later chosen as a chairman of the Association "Polish Community".

Maciej Płażyński was married to Elżbieta Płażyńska and together they had three children: Jakub, Katarzyna, and Kacper.

He died in the plane crash which occurred while landing at Smolensk-North airport near Smolensk, Russia, on 10 April 2010. The crash also involved President Lech Kaczyński and 94 others.

Honours and awards
In 2000, Płażyński was awarded the Order of Merit of the Italian Republic, First Class. He received the titles of honorary citizen of Młynary, Puck, Pionki and Lidzbark Warmiński.

On 16 April 2010 he was posthumously awarded the Grand Cross of the Order of Polonia Restituta. He was also awarded a Gold Medal of Gloria Artis.

See also
 Solidarity

References

External links

 Official site

1958 births
2010 deaths
People from Elbląg County
20th-century Polish lawyers
Marshals of the Sejm of the Third Polish Republic
Members of the Polish Sejm 1997–2001
Members of the Polish Sejm 2001–2005
Members of the Senate of Poland 2005–2007
Victims of the Smolensk air disaster
University of Gdańsk alumni
Grand Crosses of the Order of Polonia Restituta
Knights Grand Cross of the Order of Merit of the Italian Republic
Recipients of the Gold Medal for Merit to Culture – Gloria Artis
Polish Roman Catholics
Members of the Polish Sejm 2007–2011
Political party founders